Funkstörung (sometimes stylized as Funkstorung) are an electronic music duo from Rosenheim, Germany, consisting of Michael Fakesch and Chris de Luca.

History 
Chris de Luca and Michael Fakesch first met in 1992 at a techno party organised by Fakesch in Rosenheim. Subsequently, the two started producing tracks together.

In 1999, the duo released Additional Productions, a compilation album of their remixes of other artists' songs such as Björk's "All Is Full of Love", Wu-Tang Clan's "Reunited", East Flatbush Project's "Tried by 12", and Finitribe's "Mind My Make-Up". Their debut studio album, Appetite for Disctruction, followed in 2000.

In 2004, the duo released a studio album, Disconnected. The music video for "Chopping Heads", directed by Keep Adding and Scott Pagano, was selected for the International Critic's Week at the 2005 Cannes Film Festival.

In 2005, the duo released The Return to the Acid Planet, which consisted of remixes of old tracks they discovered while cleaning their studio.

In 2006, a statement was published on funkstorung.com, stating that the duo had officially broken up due to musical, personal and practical differences. Both Michael Fakesch and Christian de Luca will continue making music with their respective solo projects.

In 2015, Funkstörung released a studio album, Funkstörung, on Monkeytown Records.

Discography

Studio albums 
 Appetite for Disctruction (2000)
 Disconnected (2004)
 The Return to the Acid Planet (2005)
 Funkstörung (2015)

Compilation albums 
 Additional Productions (1999)
 Vice Versa (2001)
 Appendix (2007)

EPs 
 Bunker 024 (1995) 
 Acid Planet 11 (1995) 
 Acid Planet 12 (1995) 
 Acid Planet 13 (1995)
 Acid Planet 14 (1995)
 Musik Aus Strom 1.08 (1996)
 Breakart (1996)
 Elektromotor (1996)
 Artificial Garbage (1997)
 Funkentstört (1997)
 Sonderdienste (1997)
 Post.Art (1997)
 Multiple Grammy Winners (2000)
 Killers (2015)
 Laid Out Remixes (2015)

Singles 
 "All Is Full of Love" (1998) 
 "Fat Camp Feva" / "Disconnected" (2004)
 "Moon Addicted" / "Chopping Heads" (2004)

DVDs 
 Isolated. Triple Media. (2004)

References

External links 
 
 
 
 

German electronic music groups
Intelligent dance musicians